Dalmore was a railway station on the South Gippsland line in South Gippsland, Victoria, Australia. It operated until the late 1970s. All that remains of this station now is the platform mound, however the track is still in reasonable condition.

Disused railway stations in Victoria (Australia)